AINC may refer to:

 Audio Information Network of Colorado, radio reading service 
 Indigenous and Northern Affairs Canada, department of the government of Canada